Palaskheda is a village in Maharashtra, India. The village is located in Soegaon Tehsil of Aurangabad district.

Address 
Tal-Kaij Dist-Beed Maharashtra India PIN code-431518

Geographic Location 
18°39'59.08"N Latitude

76°15'2.77"E Longitude

Elevation 2128 feet above MSL

Population 
Palaskheda has a total population of 2,723 peoples. There are about 556 houses in the village.

References

Villages in Beed district
Maharashtra
Culture of Maharashtra
Geography of Maharashtra